Gang War in Milan is a 1973 Italian  poliziottesco film directed by Umberto Lenzi.

Cast 
 Antonio Sabàto: Salvatore Cangemi
 Philippe Leroy: Roger Daverty
 Marisa Mell: Jasmina
 Antonio Casagrande: Lino Caruso
 Carla Romanelli: Virginia 
 Tano Cimarosa: Nino Balsamo

Production
Gang War in Milan was Umberto Lenzi's first entry in the crime genre after making several spy and action films in the 1960s. Lenzi stated in an interview that both the film's story and script were by Franco Enna, a giallo novelist who lived in Switzerland and that the credited writer Ombretta Lanza was a daughter of one of the producers who attributed to the story. Lenzi than later claimed that he completely re-wrote the script as it was closer to a 1930s crime film than a film noir.

It was filmed at Icet - De Paolis Studios in Milan and on location in Milan.

Release
Gang War in Milan was released theatrically in Italy on 23 February 1973 where it was distributed by Variety Film. The film grossed a total of 631.702 million Italian lira on its release.

Reception
Director Umberto Lenzi later felt that the film's story had "a basic error on the behalf of the producers [...]. We shouldn't have made the protagonist a pimp. You can have a pickpocket, a drug dealer, or a killer, but not a pimp, because the viewer doesn't sympathize with him. He's a dirty soundrel with whom you can't identify"

See also
 List of Italian films of 1973

Footnotes

References

External links

  Film locations in Milan

1973 films
Poliziotteschi films
1973 crime films
Films scored by Carlo Rustichelli
Films set in Milan
Films shot in Italy
1970s Italian films